The California Register of Historical Resources is a California state government program for use by state and local agencies, private groups, and citizens to identify, evaluate, register and protect California's historical resources. The register is the authoritative guide to the state's significant historical and archeological resources.

The California Register program encourages public recognition and protection of resources of architectural, historical, archeological and cultural significance, identifies historical resources for state and local planning purposes, determines eligibility for state historic preservation grant funding and affords certain protections under the California Environmental Quality Act (CEQA).

Criteria for designation
In order for a resource to be designated a historical landmark, it must meet the following criteria:
Associated with events that have made a significant contribution to the broad patterns of local or regional history or the cultural heritage of California or the United States.
Associated with the lives of persons important to local, California or national history.
Embodies the distinctive characteristics of a type, period, region or method of construction or represents the work of a master or possesses high artistic values.
Has yielded, or has the potential to yield, information important to the prehistory or history of the local area, California or the nation.

Effects of designation
Limited protection: Environmental review may be required under CEQA if property is threatened by a project.
Local building inspector must grant code alternatives provided under State Historical Building Code.
Local assessor may enter into contract with property owner for property tax reduction (Mills Act).
Owner may place his or her own commemorative plaque or marker at the site of the resource.

See also
California Historical Landmark
List of California Historical Landmarks
California Points of Historical Interest
History of California

External links
Program description on the California Office of Historic Preservation web site
Official list of California Historical Resources

 Register of Historical Resources
Register of Historical Resources
State history organizations of the United States